The 2019 Kaduna State gubernatorial election occurred on March 9, 2019. APC candidate Nasir Ahmad el-Rufai defeated main opposition party PDP's candidate, Isah Ashiru, to emerge winner of the contest. APC was said to have won 14 LGAs, PDP nine.

Nasir Ahmad el-Rufai emerged winner in the APC gubernatorial primary election unopposed. His running mate was Hadiza Sabuwa Balarabe.

Of the 38 candidates who contested in the election, 36 were male, two were female.

Electoral system 
The Governor of Kaduna State is elected using the plurality voting system.

Primary election

APC primary
The APC primary election was held at Murtala Square, Kaduna. El-Rufai was declared the winner of the contest unopposed, with a total score of 2,447. However, there were a total of 33 invalid votes, according to the committee chairman of the elections, Mr Matthew Iduoriyekemwen. A total of 3,782 delegates participated in the election from across the 23 LGAs if the state.

Candidates 
Party nominee: Nasir Ahmad el-Rufai: Sole contestant (2,447 votes)
Running mate:Hadiza Sabuwa Balarabe.

PDP primary
The PDP primary election was kick-started at exactly 2:57 PM at the Kaduna International Trade Fair Complex on Sunday September 30, 2018, and concluded on Monday October 1. Isah Ashiru Kudan, who earlier contested in the 2014 APC primary elections for the 2015 Kaduna gubernatorial election coming out first runner-up, emerged victorious as the PDP flag-bearer for the 2019 Kaduna State gubernatorial election. There were 2,654 delegates from 20 of the 23 LGAs present at the 2018 PDP Kaduna gubernatorial Primaries, whose 39 votes were declared invalid. There were a total of 10 aspirants, two of which withdrew in the process.

Candidates 
 Party nominee: Isah Ashiru Kudan: Winner (1,330 votes).
 Running mate: Sunday Marshall Katung.
 Mohammed Sani Sidi: 1st Runner-up (569 votes)
 Senator Suleiman Othman Hunkuyi: 2nd Runner-up (564 votes)
 Mukhtar Ramalan Yero: 3rd Runner-up (36 votes)
 Shuaibi Miqati: 4th Runner-up (16 votes)
 Jonathan Kish Adamu: 5th Runner-up (2 votes)
 Dauda Ahmadu Ibrahim: (0 votes)
 Muhammad Sani Bello: (0 votes)
 Ja’afaru Sa’ad: Withdrew
 Muhammed Bello Umar: Withdrew

Results
A total of 38 candidates registered with the Independent National Electoral Commission to participate in the contest. APC candidate and incumbent governor Nasir el-Rufai won re-election for a second term, beating PDP aspirant Isah Ashiru by a close margin. El-Rufai received 1,045,427 valid ballot votes or 55.32% of total votes, while Ashiru bagged 814,168 valid ballot votes or 43.08% of total votes. The APGA and LM candidates earlier in February 2019 stepped down for the PDP candidate.

A total of 3,932,492 voters registered for the elections.

By local government area
A total of 38 political parties were reported by the News Agency of Nigeria (NAN) to have aspirants for the Kaduna State Governorship poll. The results of the election by local government area, representing the two major contenders are presented here below. Green represents LGAs won by Ashiru. Blue represents LGAs won by el-Rufai.

References 

Kaduna
Kaduna State gubernatorial elections
Kaduna State gubernatorial election